David Newman OBE (Hebrew: דיויד ניומן; born 4 July 1956) is a British-Israeli scholar in political geography and geopolitics. He is a professor at the Ben-Gurion University of the Negev (BGU) Department of Politics and Government and was this department's first chairperson. Newman also served as chief editor of the academic journal Geopolitics and as Dean of BGU's Faculty of Humanities and Social Sciences.

Biography
David Newman was born in London. He holds an Honours Bachelor of Arts in Geography from Queen Mary College at the University of London (1978) and a PhD in geography from the University of Durham (1981).

In 1982 he immigrated to Israel, following which he was appointed as lecturer in the Tel Aviv University Department of Geography.

In 1987 he became a senior lecturer in the Department of Geography at Ben-Gurion University of the Negev. From 1996 to 1998 he served as Director of its Hubert Humphrey Institute for Social Research. In 1988 he founded the Ben-Gurion University Department of Politics and Government, and served as its first chairperson until 2003. That year he facilitated the founding of the BGU Centre for the Study of European Politics and Society (CSEPS), with which he is affiliated.

From 1997 to 2003 and again from 2009 until 2016, Newman published a weekly op-ed column in The Jerusalem Post. He also published essays and opinion columns in newspapers and magazines, such as The New York Times, The Guardian, and Tikkun Magazine. His political activities have focused on the Israeli peace camp, arguing for territorial withdrawal and the establishment of a Palestinian state alongside Israel as part of a Two-state solution to the conflict.

From 1999–2014 Newman served as editor, together with Professor John Agnew from UCLA and more recently with Prof Simon Dalby from the University of Waterloo in Canada, of the international journal Geopolitics, published quarterly by Taylor and Francis (Routledge).

Newman played a leading role in the defence of Israeli universities and the academic community in the face of a proposed academic boycott of Israel during 2006–2008.

Since the mid-1990s, Newman has been active in activities which negate the attempts to impose any form of academic boycott on Israeli scholars or institutions. He has been subject to attacks by organisations in Israel that Newman has described as "extremist right-wing groups", such as IsraCampus, Academic Monitor, Im Tirzu, and the NGO Monitor, for his founding and leadership of the Department of Politics and Government at the University and for his left of center political positions on the Arab–Israeli conflict. During 2012–2013, Newman was active in defending his University and Department against attempts at right wing political intervention on the part of Israel's Council of Higher Education.

During the years 2013–2016 Newman was Dean of the Faculty for Humanities and Social Sciences at BGU.
 
Newman was appointed Officer of the Order of the British Empire (OBE) in the 2013 Birthday Honours for services to higher education and the humanities and promoting academic links between the UK and Israel.

In June 2014, Ben Gurion University appointed Newman as the first incumbent of a new University Professorial Chair in Geopolitics.

Newman wrote or coauthored the following entries in the Encyclopedia Judaica: aliyah, Gush Emunim, State of Israel,  and religious peace movements.

Affiliations and public activities
Newman is associated with a number of border and boundary related institutions, such as the International Boundaries Research Unit in the UK, the Association of Borderland Studies in the USA, the Border Regions in Transition (BRIT) network, and, until 2012,  as the Secretary of the Commission on the World Political Map (WPM) of the International Geographical Union. He has facilitated and attended as keynote speaker at international gatherings dealing with geopolitical and border related issues. Newman has spent periods of time as visiting professor and research fellow at a number of universities and research institutions throughout Europe and North America. In 2006, Newman was the Leverhulme Professor in Geopolitics at the University of Bristol in the UK.

Newman has been involved in a series of research projects, peace-related activities and a variety of Track II discussions and negotiations. This includes joint Israeli-Palestinian projects looking at territorial and border issues, funded by the Ford Foundation, the John D. and Catherine T. MacArthur Foundation (both with Ghazi Falah, the United States Institute of Peace in a project examining potential cross-border co-operation between Israel and a future Palestinian State, a European Union consortium project looking at the role of the EU in intervening in border conflicts, and a European Union Partnership in Peace programme, facilitating peace related workshops for religious teachers in Israel and Palestine. From 2012–2016, Newman is part of a 20 university pan-European consortium of the FP7 (EU) funded project on Borderscapes, headed up by the University of Joensuu in Finland. In 2013, Newman and Ben-Gurion University became part of the new borders project, Borders in Globalization, funded by the Canadian SSHRC and headed by Prof. Emmanuel Brunet-Jailly at the University of Victoria, Canada.

References

External links
Demarcating the Israeli-Palestinian Border, Fathom: For a deeper understanding of Israel and the region, 3 June 2014

1956 births
Living people
English geographers
English political scientists
Israeli geographers
Israeli political scientists
Political geographers
Academic staff of Ben-Gurion University of the Negev
Alumni of Queen Mary University of London
Jewish social scientists
Officers of the Order of the British Empire
Academics from London
British emigrants to Israel
Alumni of Durham University Graduate Society